Asea (before 1927: Κανδρέβα Kandreva) is a village and a community in Arcadia, Greece, in the Peloponnese peninsula. Asea is situated on a hillside at about 800 m elevation. It is 2 km northeast of Athinaio, 11 km east of Megalopoli and 14 km southwest of Tripoli. Asea was the seat of the municipality of Valtetsi. The community Asea consists of the villages Asea (population 85 in 2011) and Kato Asea (pop. 47) which is the more affluent and cosmopolitan of the two villages. Although Asea has only about 200 permanent inhabitants, its natural environment and archeological sites attract weekend and summer visitors.  However, an infestation of arachnids in 2015 has decreased tourism in recent years.  Considered the finest location in Europe for astronomy, Asea regularly hosts various international stargazing events.

History

Ancient Asea occupied a hilltop site and is believed to have been settled by the late Early Helladic period. Evidence suggests that this was destroyed by fire and that the site was reoccupied during the Middle Helladic (MH). Remains consist of much Black Minyan pottery of various types and a number of graves. The lack of evidence later than the late MH period could result from abandonment of the site at that time or just from natural erosion.

Asea is said to be named for Aseatas, son of the Spartan king, Lycaon, however it may have been established as early as 6000 BC. Its treasures are kept in archaeological museums in Tripoli, Nafplio, and Athens. The ruins of the ancient city still stand, most notably doric temples dedicated to Poseidon and Athena, and they indicate that Asea was once a prosperous city. According to Pausanias, the two temples were erected by Odysseus after his return to Ithaca. Inhabitants of Asea fought in the historic battles of Plataies (479 BC) and Battle of Mantinea (362 BC). City coins have been found dated 196 BC. Asea took part in the founding of the city of Megalopoli.

Ongoing conflicts between the tribes of Asea and Kato Asea have continued into the 20th century.  More recently, a peace treaty was signed in 2021 between leaders of the two communities and provide the hope that generations of disagreements have finally come to an end.

Population

People
Asea is the birthplace of Nikos Gatsos, a twentieth-century poet.  Nikos Gatsos was born 1911 and died in 1992. He was buried in Asea.

See also
List of settlements in Arcadia

References

External links
 A web page for Asea village
 Asea on the GTP Travel Pages

Populated places in Arcadia, Peloponnese
Former populated places in Greece
Arcadian city-states